HMS Hodgeston was a  which saw service with the Royal Navy during the Cold War. Built by Fleetlands Shipyard, she was launched on 6 April 1954 and broken up in 1988.

Construction and design
Hodgeston was ordered on 14 February 1952, was laid down at Fleetland Shipyard's Gosport yard on 22 September 1952, was launched on 6 April 1954 and commissioned on 17 December 1954.

Armament consisted of a single Bofors 40 mm anti-aircraft gun forward and two Oerlikon 20 mm cannon aft. Minesweeping equipment included wire sweeps for sweeping moored contact mines and acoustic or magnetic sweeps for dealing with influence mines. The ship had a crew of 27 in peacetime and 39 in wartime.

Service
Hodgeston spent many years attached to the 10th Mine Counter Measure (MCM10) Squadron manned by the Royal Naval Reserve (RNR).

Between 1954 and 1960 she was renamed HMS Northumbria whilst attached to the Tyne Division of the RNR  based at Gateshead. Cyprian Prince towed her into port. On 24 July 1960, Northumbria ran aground at Lindisfarne, Northumberland. Between 1961 and 1975 she was renamed HMS Venturer whilst attached as sea-going tender to the Severn Division of the RNR at  based in Bristol.

On 1 January 1976, the ship joined the South-West group of the 10th Mine Counter Measures Squadron, reverting to her original name Hodgeston. She attended the 1977 Silver Jubilee Fleet Review off Spithead when she was part of the 10th Mine Countermeasures Squadron. In 1979, she was attached to the Clyde division of the RNR, while later that year, she transferred to the Fishery Protection Squadron. Hodgeston went to the assistance of Tarpenbek, and when the tanker capsized in heavy seas, helped to co-ordinate with salvage vessels, which managed to recover the oil, preventing major ecological damage, and salvaged the tanker, righting her by Parbucking. Later that summer, she went to the aid of the trawler Excellent, which had caught a mine in her nets, escorting the trawler to Penzance Bay where bomb disposal squads dealt with the mine.

On 23 June 1982 she was part of the North West group of the RNR, and was attached to the Clyde division again in 1983.

Following this she spent time attached to the Fisheries Protection Squadron of the Royal Navy before being sold in September 1988. She was broken up at Bruges by 29 December 1988.

She is the only ship of the name to serve in the Royal Navy to date.

Commanding officers

References

Publications
 
 
 
 
 
 
 
 

 

Ton-class minesweepers of the Royal Navy
Ships built in Portsmouth
1954 ships
Cold War minesweepers of the United Kingdom
Maritime incidents in 1955
Maritime incidents in 1960